The Tatra Electric Railway, colloquially Tatra Railway, is an electrified (1500 V DC) single track  narrow gauge railway in the Slovak part of the Tatra mountains. It consists of two connected lines:

 Poprad – Starý Smokovec – Štrbské Pleso (29,1 km)
 Starý Smokovec – Tatranská Lomnica (5,9 km)

At Štrbské Pleso, the railway connects to the Štrbské Pleso–Štrba rack railway.

History
After the completion of the Košice-Bohumín Railway in 1871 and of Poprad - Kežmarok in 1892, the High Tatras were easier to access, and tourism expanded, which required accessibility. In 1896, a rack railway from Štrbské Pleso to Štrba was built.

Finally, it was decided to build an electrified, narrow gauge railway from Poprad to Starý Smokovec. Construction started in 1906 and the track was opened in 1908. The branch line from Starý Smokovec to Tatranská Lomnica was opened in 1911 and the final extension from Starý Smokovec to Štrbské Pleso was opened in 1912. At that time, the railway was used for passenger, as well as for cargo transport.

In 1948, the railway was nationalised. From 1950 to 1992, it was managed by the Czechoslovak State Railways and since 1993 by the Railways of the Slovak Republic.

In the second half of the 1960s, the railway underwent major reconstruction during preparations for the FIS Nordic World Ski Championships in 1970. Since 1970, the railway provides only passenger service.

At the beginning of the 21st century, the old ČSD Class EMU 89.0 trains built by ČKD in the 1960s were replaced by new Stadler GTW ZSSK Class 425.95 railcars.

Rolling stock

Network map

Gallery

See also

High Tatras
List of highest railways in Europe

References

External links

 Map of the network
 About the Tatra railway 

Railway lines in Slovakia
Metre gauge railways in Slovakia
1500 V DC railway electrification